Hugh Smith Thompson (January 24, 1836November 20, 1904) was the 81st governor of South Carolina, from 1882 to 1886.

Biography 
Born in Charleston, Thompson graduated from the South Carolina Military Academy (now The Citadel) in 1856 and was an instructor at the Arsenal Academy from 1858 to 1861. Leading a battalion of Citadel cadets on January 9, 1861, they fired the first shots of the American Civil War when they opened fire on the Union ship Star of the West entering Charleston's harbor. For the remainder of the war, he served as an instructor of the cadets at the Citadel Academy.

At the end of hostilities in 1865, Thompson became the principal of Columbia Male Academy until 1880. In 1876, he was nominated by the state Democrats for the position of Superintendent of Education which he won upon the resolution of the controversial gubernatorial election in the favor of Wade Hampton and the Democrats. He was reelected in 1878 and 1880 without opposition and in 1882 Thompson lobbied for the presidency of South Carolina College. However, he emerged as a dark horse candidate for governor after the split of the state Democrats between John Bratton and John Doby Kennedy. After the second ballot at the nominating convention, both Bratton and Kennedy withdrew their names and Thompson became the Democratic candidate for the gubernatorial election of 1882.

Thompson easily won the general election against J. Hendrix McLane and became the 81st governor of South Carolina. He was reelected without opposition in the gubernatorial election of 1884 and his time as governor was marked by stability of the state and unity within the Democratic party. Upon being appointed in 1886 by President Grover Cleveland to be Assistant Secretary of the Treasury, Thompson resigned as governor. In 1889, he became the commissioner of the U.S. Civil Service Commission after appointment by President Benjamin Harrison. He retired from public service in 1892 and for over a decade was the comptroller of the New York Life Insurance Company.

On November 20, 1904, Thompson died in New York City and was buried at Trinity Episcopal churchyard in Columbia.

References 

1836 births
1904 deaths
The Citadel, The Military College of South Carolina alumni
The Citadel, The Military College of South Carolina faculty
Democratic Party governors of South Carolina
University of South Carolina trustees
South Carolina Superintendent of Education